NetDragon Websoft is a Chinese company that develops and operates massively multiplayer online games in addition to making mobile applications. The company debuted its first product in 2002.

Some self-developed games it operates in China are based on Western IP, such as properties of Disney, Electronic Arts, and Ubisoft. Other games based on its own IP are distributed in CIS nations, the Middle East, North Africa, Portugal, Russia, and Vietnam, etc. Some games are also available in English.

Prior to selling this side of the business to Baidu, the company created a mobile phone app store stocked with self-created games and applications. NetDragon had differentiated itself by eschewing selling apps through the distribution channels of others instead creating its own; in essence making consumers download an app to download an app but allowing them exposure to other Netdragon offerings in the process.

Education
NetDragon Websoft started getting involved in education in 2010 with the aims to develop "the largest learning community globally."

NetDragon has made several acquisitions regarding education and community, amongst which are included:

 A partnership with the University of North Texas to launch the UNT-NetDragon Digital Research Centre.
 Edmodo was acquired by NetDragon on April 8, 2018.
 On July 3, 2017, NetDragon announced that it had acquired American educational software publisher JumpStart Games.
 NetDragon also acquired a 100 percent stake in the UK-listed Promethean Limited back in 2015.

Sale of 91 Wireless
NetDragon sold its app store, 91 Wireless, to Baidu for $1.85 billion in what was hailed as the biggest deal ever in China's IT sector. As the company controlled less than 58% of 91 Wireless, Netdragon took an estimated $1.06 billion from the sale.

The mobile applications available through this store, many of which are "91" branded, are quite disparate and include more than mobile games  running the gamut from fortune telling to wealth management.

CSR
The company sponsors the Fujian NetDragon Youth Business Foundation, which helps entrepreneurial youth to start a small business.

See also
Disney Fantasy Online
Heroes of Might and Magic Online
Transformers Online
91kt.com
91 Wireless
Edmodo
Promethean World
JumpStart

References 

Chinese brands
Companies based in Fuzhou
Companies listed on the Hong Kong Stock Exchange
Massively multiplayer online games
 
Companies established in 1999
Video game companies of China
Video game development companies